Arkhangelskoye is a rural locality (a selo) and the administrative center of Arkhangelskoye Rural Settlement, Sokolsky District, Vologda Oblast, Russia. The population was 273 as of 2002.

Geography 
The distance to Sokol is 15 km. Koryakino is the nearest rural locality.

References 

Rural localities in Sokolsky District, Vologda Oblast